Villa Wolf was an architecturally significant building in Gubin, Poland, designed by the German architect Ludwig Mies van der Rohe. It is also known as Haus Wolf. The property was developed in Guben, Germany, between 1925 and 1926two decades before the Oder–Neisse line divided the city to create Gubinfor Erich and Elisabeth Wolf. It was one of the pioneering prototypes of modern architecture in Europe, and is considered the first modern work of Mies van der Rohe. It stood between two gardens parallel to the Lusatian Neisse river at Teichbornstraße 13 in today's Gubin, which at that time still belonged to Guben, but is now located in the Polish part of Lower Lusatia. It was destroyed during World War II in 1945 and there are plans to reconstruct it.

History 

The building was commissioned in 1925 by the cloth and textile manufacturer Erich Wolf (1883–1958). He increased his wealth by marrying Elisabeth Wilke (1894–1987), who in turn had inherited a hat factory, in 1922. He had chosen an elevation in Guben as the building site, from which one had an overview of the industrial plants running along the Neisse. The narrow hillside plot ran along Teichbornstraße (today ulica Krolewska) and Grüne Wiese (today ulica Piastowska).

With the advance of the Red Army in World War II the family fled in 1945. They left everything behind, the building burnt down and was not rebuilt. The remaining building materials were used for the reconstruction of buildings in Gubin. In the 1960s, the land was apparently leveled. The area was greened and integrated into the newly created Waszkiewicz Park in 1977.

From 2001 onwards, on the initiative of the Internationale Bauausstellung Fürst-Pückler-Land under the direction of Lars Scharnholz of the Brandenburg University of Technology (BTU), the foundations were excavated and then measured and documented by the Museum of Modern Art. Further investigations with ground-penetrating radar are planned in order to determine the structure of the building in more detail. In 2006, a "Mies-Memory-Box" in Gubin provided information about the building with historical photographs as well as shard remains from the Wolf's porcelain collection. It was subsequently shown in Wroclaw, Berlin, Dessau and Stuttgart. Today marks on the ground in the park are reminders of the villa.

Following the idea of the city planner Florian Mausbach, a German-Polish initiative is striving to reconstruct the building. The Government of Poland signaled its support in 2019.

Architecture 
The plans for the building envisaged a simple cubic, red-black clad clinker brick building with an asymmetrical design of flat cuboids of different sizes. The house had around over 1000 m2. The facade and interior walls were clad with flat ashlars. The front of the house was oriented to the west, the entrance was on the east side. The building had a "treasure chamber" to house the Wolf collection of art and paintings as well as a sculpture collection. The open interiors were laid out to interplay with the nature outside. Spacious terraces took up the feeling of space, which was to become a characteristic of the architect's later buildings of openness and flow. However, Mies van der Rohe designed not only the building shell, but also objects for the interior decoration.

After completion the facades were bare. Vines were planted afterwards along it.

Mies van der Rohe donated the original pencil drawings and sketches to the Museum of Modern Art in New York. The museum also has a scale model created in 2001 that was shown in various exhibitions.

Images

See also  
 Haus Lange and Haus Esters in Krefeld 
 Villa Tugendhat in Brno
 Villa Cavrois in Croix

References

Bibliography 

 Blakwood, M. (Director). (1985). Mies [Motion Picture]. 
 Cohen, J.-L. (1996). Mies Van der Rohe. London: E & FN Spon. 
 Davies, C. (2006). Wolf House. In C. Davies, Key Houses of the Twentieth Century- Plans, Sections and Elevations (pp. 58–59). London: Laurence King Publisher. 
 Franz Schulze, i. a. (1989). Mies Van der Rohe, A Critical Biography. Chicago: University of Chicago Press.

External links

 Website for the reconstruction of Villa Wolf
 Wolf Villa Poster (PDF) at Carlos DeMalchi blog
 3D Model of the villa

Houses completed in 1926
International Style (architecture)
Ludwig Mies van der Rohe buildings
Modernist architecture in Poland
Functionalist architecture
Villas in Poland
Buildings and structures in Poland destroyed during World War II